The Amsterdam coronation riots refers to major violence and rioting in Amsterdam, the Netherlands, on the day of the accession of Queen Beatrix, 30 April 1980. It was one of the biggest episodes of such disturbances in the country since the end of World War II and the most significant event of the Dutch squatters' movement (Krakersrellen).

Background
Since the 1960s and the 1970s, squatting had become common in Amsterdam to protest the city's shortage of housing. Many of the protesters were young people of the baby boomer generation. The 1980 riots were preceded by the Nieuwmarkt Riots in 1975 and the Vondelstraat Riots in March 1980, when authorities heavily responded to evict squatters from properties in the city.

On 31 January, Queen Juliana announced that she would abdicate in favour of her eldest daughter, Princess Beatrix, on 30 April.

Riots

Beatrix ascended the throne on 30 April 1980, and squatters started to riot. The protesters were rallying under the slogan Geen woning, geen kroning (No house, no coronation). Due to the presence of 10,000 police officers, gendarmes and some military officers, the event turned into a major clash. The riots were centred around the Dam Square, where the new Queen's inauguration took place. Clashes also happened in and around Blauwbrug, Rokin and Vondelstraat.

One of the protesters, Karel Fassotte, claimed in an interview that apart from squatters, people taking part included ordinary students and football hooligans.

It marked a milestone in the mostly peaceful post-war history of the Netherlands. 600 people were wounded in the riots.

Aftermath
The squatters' movement had enjoyed much public support for their cause beforehand, but that was depreciated following the riots, partly because the Dutch royal family was highly popular, while the squatters had turned the day of accession into one of violence.

A new police leadership in Amsterdam started to force the evacuation of squatted buildings, including through special means.

In 2010, the Dutch parliament voted to ban squatting entirely.

See also
Nieuwmarkt riots
Vondelstraat riots
2021 Dutch curfew riots

References

1980 in the Netherlands
1980s in Amsterdam
Riots and civil disorder in the Netherlands
1980 riots
Events in Amsterdam
April 1980 events in Europe
Dutch monarchy
1980 crimes in the Netherlands
Squatting in the Netherlands